The 1958 USC Trojans baseball team represented the University of Southern California in the 1958 NCAA University Division baseball season. The team was coached by Rod Dedeaux in his 17th season.

The Trojans won the College World Series, defeating the Missouri Tigers in the championship game.

Roster

Schedule 

! style="background:#FFCC00;color:#990000;"| Regular Season
|- valign="top" 

|- align="center" bgcolor="ddffdd"
| March 18 ||  || 10–0 || 1–0 || –
|- align="center" bgcolor="ddffdd"
| March 28 ||  || 7–3 || 2–0 || 1–0
|- align="center" bgcolor="ddffdd"
| March 29 || Santa Clara || 21–5 || 3–0 || 2–0
|-

|- align="center" bgcolor="ddffdd"
| April 11 || at  || 4–2 || 4–0 || 3–0
|- align="center" bgcolor="ddffdd"
| April 12 || at  || 10–5 || 5–0 || 4–0
|- align="center" bgcolor="ddffdd"
| April 12 || at Stanford || 13–4 || 6–0 || 5–0
|- align="center" bgcolor="ffdddd"
| April 19 || California || 5–7 || 6–1 || 5–1
|- align="center" bgcolor="ddffdd"
| April 19 || California || 10–5 || 7–1 || 6–1
|- align="center" bgcolor="#ddffdd"
| April 25 || at  || 13–4 || 8–1 || –
|- align="center" bgcolor="ddffdd"
| April 29 ||  || 8–2 || 9–1 || –
|-

|- align="center" bgcolor="#ddffdd"
| May 2 || at  || 3–0 || 10–1 || 7–1
|- align="center" bgcolor="#ddffdd"
| May 3 || UCLA || 21–2 || 11–1 || 8–1
|- align="center" bgcolor="ddffdd"
| May 6 ||  || 16–2 || 12–1 || –
|- align="center" bgcolor="ddffdd"
| May 9 || Stanford || 19–13 || 13–1 || 9–1
|- align="center" bgcolor="ddffdd"
| May 10 || Stanford || 9–2 || 14–1 || 10–1
|- align="center" bgcolor="ddffdd"
| May 13 ||  || 5–4 || 15–1 || –
|- align="center" bgcolor="ffdddd"
| May 16 || at California || 6–7 || 15–2 || 10–2
|- align="center" bgcolor="ddffdd"
| May 17 || at Santa Clara || 12–11 || 16–2 || 11–2
|- align="center" bgcolor="ddffdd"
| May 17 || at Santa Clara || 5–4 || 17–2 || 12–2
|- align="center" bgcolor="ddffdd"
| May 23 || UCLA || 23–1 || 18–2 || 13–2
|- align="center" bgcolor="ddffdd"
| May 24 || at UCLA || 15–1 || 19–2 || 14–2
|-

|-
! style="background:#FFCC00;color:#990000;"| Post–Season
|-

|- align="center" bgcolor="ddffdd"
| May 30 ||  || 7–0 || 20–2
|- align="center" bgcolor="ddffdd"
| May 31 || Oregon State || 15–0 || 21–2
|-

|- align="center" bgcolor="ddffdd"
| June 6 || vs.  || 6–0 || 22–2
|- align="center" bgcolor="ddffdd"
| June 7 || vs. Portland || 11–1 || 23–2
|-

|- align="center" bgcolor="ffdddd"
| June 14 || vs. Holy Cross || Rosenblatt Stadium || 0–3 || 23–3
|- align="center" bgcolor="ddffdd"
| June 15 || vs. Arizona || Rosenblatt Stadium || 4–0 || 24–3
|- align="center" bgcolor="ddffdd"
| June 16 || vs.  || Rosenblatt Stadium || 12–1 || 25–3
|- align="center" bgcolor="ddffdd"
| June 17 || vs. Holy Cross || Rosenblatt Stadium || 6–2 || 26–3
|- align="center" bgcolor="ddffdd"
| June 18 || vs. Missouri || Rosenblatt Stadium || 7–0 || 27–3
|- align="center" bgcolor="ddffdd"
| June 19 || vs. Missouri || Rosenblatt Stadium || 8–7 || 28–3
|-

Awards and honors 
Mike Castanon
 All-American Second Team
 College World Series All-Tournament Team
 All-PCC First Team

Ron Fairly
 College World Series All-Tournament Team
 All-PCC First Team

Ken Guffey Miller
 All-American 1959
 All-PCC First Team 1957, 1958 and 1959

Fred Scott
 All-PCC First Team
 College World Series All-Tournament Team

Jerry Siegert
 All-America First Team

Bill Thom
 College World Series Most Outstanding Player
 All-PCC First Team

References 

USC
USC Trojans baseball seasons
College World Series seasons
NCAA Division I Baseball Championship seasons
Pac-12 Conference baseball champion seasons